Drago Mlinarec may refer to:

 Drago Mlinarec (ice hockey) (born 1960), Slovenian international hockey player
 Drago Mlinarec (musician) (born 1942), Croatian pop/rock scriptwriter and composer